Zero is a 2009 Polish action film directed by Paweł Borowski.

Cast 
 Robert Więckiewicz − Chairman
 Aleksandra Popławska − Chairman's wife
 Bogdan Koca − Private detective 
 Cezary Kosiński − Employee of the Chairman's company
 Andrzej Mastalerz − Newspaper seller
 Roma Gąsiorowska − Porno star
 Małgorzata Buczkowska - Cashier
  − Porno film producer
 Michał Żurawski - Chairman's wife lover

References

External links 

2009 action films
2009 films
Polish action films
2000s Polish-language films